State Route 122 (SR 122) is an Ohio state highway which runs from the Ohio-Indiana state line in Preble County east of Eaton, Ohio to SR 48 near Lebanon, Ohio, a distance of . When the route was designated in 1923, it ran along its current route from Indiana to Middletown. It was extended to its current eastern terminus in 1937 but was extended further east to U.S. Route 42 in 1946. The route was truncated back to SR 48 by 1985 with the former section being renamed "Old State Route 122" and maintained by Warren County as CR 230. The route also used to continue west of the Indiana state line as Indiana State Road 122 west to its terminus at US 27 east of Abington, Indiana.

Major intersections

Westbound directional alternate

References

123
Transportation in Preble County, Ohio
Transportation in Butler County, Ohio
Transportation in Warren County, Ohio